Ehloec is a village in the municipality of Kičevo, North Macedonia. It was previously part of the Drugovo Municipality. It historically has been identified as a Mijak village.

Demographics
According to the 2002 census, the village had a total of 20 inhabitants. Ethnic groups in the village include:
 Macedonians : 20

References

External links

Villages in Kičevo Municipality